Rovito is a town and comune in the province of Cosenza in the Calabria region of southern Italy.

Geography
The town is located in the western suburb of Cosenza, near the Sila mountain range. It borders with the municipalities of Casali del Manco, Celico, Cosenza, Lappano, San Pietro in Guarano    and Zumpano.

References

External links

Official website

Cities and towns in Calabria